Bill Henderson is an American politician and a Republican member of the Wyoming House of Representatives representing District 41 since January 10, 2017.

Elections

2014
Henderson challenged incumbent Republican Representative Dan Zwonitzer in the District 43 Republican primary and lost to Zwonitzer. Later that year, Henderson ran for a position on the Laramie County School District #1 Board of Trustees and lost in the general election.

2016
Incumbent Democratic Representative Ken Esquibel retired to run for a seat in the Wyoming Senate being vacated by Tony Ross. Henderson declared his candidacy for the seat, facing Patrick Fitzgerald in the Republican primary. Henderson defeated Fitzgerald by two votes to become the Republican nominee. He faced Democrat Amy Simpson in the general election and defeated her with 51% of the vote.

References

External links
Profile from Ballotpedia

Living people
Republican Party members of the Wyoming House of Representatives
Politicians from Cheyenne, Wyoming
University of Wyoming alumni
Year of birth missing (living people)
21st-century American politicians